Madatapa Managed Reserve is a protected area in Ninotsminda Municipality in Samtskhe-Javakheti region of Georgia. It protects Madatapa Lake situated in the south-eastern part of the volcanic Javakheti Plateau, at an altitude of 2108 m above sea level.

Madatapa Managed Reserve is part of Javakheti Protected Areas which also includes Javakheti National Park, Kartsakhi Managed Reserve, Sulda Managed Reserve, Khanchali Managed Reserve, Bugdasheni Managed Reserve.

Fauna 
Madatapa Lake is one of the most important in Georgia for breeding and staging waterbirds such as the endangered Dalmatian pelican. Since 2020 the Lake has been designated as a protected Ramsar site.

See also
 Javakheti National Park

References 

Managed reserves of Georgia (country)
Ramsar sites in Georgia (country)
Protected areas established in 2011
Geography of Samtskhe–Javakheti
Tourist attractions in Samtskhe–Javakheti